John T. Davis is an American music journalist and author based in Austin, Texas. He is the author of Austin City Limits: 25 Years of American Music.

History 
Although based in Austin, Texas, John T. Davis' family roots are in New Mexico.  In The Best of No Depression, John T. Davis was described as a "journalist, author and music historian." As a journalist, Davis' work has been published in Billboard, Newsday New Mexico Magazine, the Austin Chronicle, the Austin American-Statesman, Texas Monthly, and Texas Highways. In 2014, Davis published The Flatlanders: Now It's Now Again, a biography of the country band from Lubbock, Texas. The University of Texas Press wrote that Davis "traces the band’s musical journey from the house on 14th Street in Lubbock to their 2013 sold-out concert at Carnegie Hall. He explores why music was, and is, so important in Lubbock." John T. Davis has co-authored three mystery novels with Brett Douglass and James R. Dennis under the nom de plum Miles Arceneaux. 

The Dolph Briscoe Center for American History at the University of Texas at Austin holds an archive of Davis' papers, interviews, and recordings.

Bibliography

Non-fiction 

 The Flatlanders – Now It’s Now Again, University of Texas Press – 2014 
 Austin City Limits: 25 Years of American Music, Billboard Press – 2000
 Austin: Lone Star Rising, Towery Publishing – 1994

Fiction 
As co-author

 Ransom Island, Stephen F. Austin University Press – 2014
 La Salle’s Ghost, Stephen F. Austin University Press – 2013
 Thin Slice of Life, Stephen F. Austin University Press – 2012

References

External links 
 

Living people
Year of birth missing (living people)
Place of birth missing (living people)
American music journalists
Writers from Austin, Texas
Journalists from Texas
American music critics